The Taiwan Banana Research Institute (TBRI) specializes in the breeding of bananas and research about their cultivation and diseases. Bananas are Taiwan's most important export fruit.

History
The TBRI was founded in 1970 in response to the devastation in 1967 of Taiwan's banana industry by the Panama disease. The original sponsors were the Taiwan Banana Fruit Quality Improvement association, the Taiwan Provincial Fruit and Marketing Cooperative, and the Joint Commission on Rural Reconstruction.

In response to TR4 the TBRI grew millions of tissue-cultured banana plantlets in the hopes of generating beneficial mutations which would improve resistance to TR4. From these two Giant Cavendish Tissue Culture Variants known as GCTCV 218 and GCTCV 219 which have increased resistance to TR4.

Developed varieties

Formosana
The Formosana is resistant to Panama disease TR4.

See also
Taiwan Sugar Research Institute

References

1970 establishments in Taiwan
Agricultural research institutes in Taiwan
Bananas